This is a list of United States congresspersons by brevity of service. It includes representatives and senators who have served less than two years in the House or six years in the Senate, not counting currently serving members. This list excludes members whose term ended with 73rd United States Congress that served the entirety of that term, which due to the Twentieth Amendment to the United States Constitution, only lasted from March 4, 1933, to January 3, 1935, and inaugural holders of Class 1 and Class 2 Senate seats that served the entirety of the first term, due to the initial terms being only 2 and 4 years long respectively, as the Senate classes were staggered so that a third of the seats would be up every two years.

Key

Senate time

House time

See also
List of members of the United States Congress by longevity of service
List of members of the United States House of Representatives who served a single term

Notes

References

Longevity
United States Congress